The Women's Keirin is one of the 9 women's events at the 2009 UCI Track Cycling World Championships, held in Pruszków, Poland.

20 Cyclists from 16 countries participated in the contest, which was held on 29 March.

First round

Heat 1

Heat 2

Heat 3

First Round Repechage

Heat 1

Heat 2

Heat 3

Second round

Heat 1

Heat 2

Finals

Final 1-6

Final 7-12

Final Standings 13-20

References

Women's keirin
UCI Track Cycling World Championships – Women's keirin